Clippesby is a village and former civil parish, now in the parish of in Fleggburgh, in the Great Yarmouth district, in the county of Norfolk, England. It located on the B1152 and surrounded by the Norfolk Broads. The village consists largely of a few rows of small cottages and houses with four buildings of historical relevance, the Church of St. Peter's, the Rectory, the Old Hall (now Old Hall Farm) and Clippesby Hall (formerly Clippesby House). It is surrounded by outlying farmsteads. Farming and tourism comprise the majority of its economy, the latter being based in the grounds of Clippesby Hall. In 1931 the parish had a population of 136.

Toponymy 
Clippesby is believed to have Viking origins (indicated by the "by" ending to its name). The villages name means 'Klyppr's/Klippr's farm/settlement'.

History
The settlement was bordered by the saltwater lagoon that existed before the sandspit where Great Yarmouth now stands formed to block the entrance to the North Sea. Subsequent drainage by windpumps created rich agricultural land upon which the settlement was largely dependent until recent years. There is an entry for Clippesby in the 1086 Domesday Book where it is recorded as Clepesbei. On 1 April 1935 the parish was abolished and merged with Fleggburgh.

Clippesby Hall

Clippesby Hall has had two incarnations over its history. The first Hall appears to date from 1585 (although Osbert de Salicibus alias de Willows is recorded as Lord in the reign of Henry II – 1154–1189). It was most notably occupied by Sir Clipesby Crewe, Chief Justice of England and first Recorder of Great Yarmouth. The Old Hall subsequently became a farm and is today known as "Old Hall Farm".

The current Hall was formerly known as Clippesby House.

The second Hall and estate was first owned by the Muskett family and is described in the 1903 sales catalogue (reproduced below).

In 1909 the hall was purchased by the artist Peregrine Feeney and his wife Emily. She was the sister-in-law of the noted pre-raphaelite painter John William Waterhouse who became a regular visitor and painted the hall on at least one occasion.

Originally the Hall had two storeys but following its use by the army in World War II the upper floor fell into disrepair and was demolished.

Since the war the estate has been used as a market garden, a garden centre and is currently a holiday park. The Hall is still a family home.

Extract from the 1903 Sale Catalogue for Clippesby Hall

General Remarks

The Clippesby Hall Estate lies mainly in a ring fence and is considered to be one of the most desirable Sporting Properties of its size in the County. There is a fair proportion of well placed covert with plenty of water, which forms an admirable Shelter and Rearing Ground for Pheasants; the uplands are very 'kind for partridges, whilst on, the marshes there is always a good stock of strong Hares.

The Hall occupies a healthy situation on the crown of a gentle eminence, is screened on the North and East by well-grown timber, and commands pleasing views of wood and water. It has recently been put into a thorough state of structural and decorative repair by the present occupier, who has been at considerable expense and evinced great taste in making it one of the best-appointed residences in the district.

From its close proximity to Acle Bridge and Potter Heigham (both favourite boating stations, whence the ever-pleasing Broads and waterways of Norfolk can be reached), the Hall forms a very attractive home for Yachtsmen.

As regards the Farms, the Arable Lands being of first-rate quality, with a large proportion of superior marshes adjoining, no difficulty need be anticipated in finding tenants at rents equal to or even in excess of the present amount. The majority of the fields abut on good roads, whilst the, river being close at hand, affords an expeditious and cheap means of carriage for corn, coal, and feeding stuffs, thus reducing the tenants' expenses for cartage.

Clippesby is equidistant (about 3 miles) from Acle Station on the Great Eastern Railway; and, Martham Station on the Midland and Great Northern Joint Railway, 5 miles from the' Sea, 9 miles from Great Yarmouth, and 14 from Norwich.

The old Hall, at present used as a Farmhouse, is a fine example of a sixteenth-century Manor House, and bears date 1585. In its windows and carved over the fireplace of the panelled parlour are coats of arms, reputed to be those of its former owners, Clippesby Crewe (Chief Justice of England, and the first recorder of Yarmouth, 1608), and Wryght.

To the memory of John Clippesby, the last of his name, who died in 1594, there is a well-preserved brass in the chancel of St. Peter's Church, which is within a few hundred yards of the Hall, and possesses two interesting specimens of Norman doorways.

The earlier history of the property is believed to be as follows:- 
Osbert de Salicibus alias de Willows was Lord in the reign of Henry II. In 1320 and in 1338 Peter Buxkyn or de Bukeskyn presented to the Church as Lord.

Sir Clippesby Crewe, grandson of the Chief Justice, appears to have sold the Manor to Sir John Potts, Bart., of Mannington, afterwards it became in turn the property of George England, Captain Clarke, John Ramey, who devised it to his son-in-law, Alexander, ninth Earl of Home, and ultimately 
it was sold to Joseph Muskett.

All the tenants pay ordinary tenant's rates and taxes, except where otherwise stated. 
Sporting rights are reserved in the case of all the agricultural tenancies and are now vested in the present tenant of Clippesby Hall during his tenancy thereof. 
The bulk of the Estate is subject to Land Tax and the whole of it to Tithe Rent charge, which 
are both payable by the Landlord.

The Purchasers of Lots 1 to 6 inclusive are to pay for Timber and underwoods in accordance with the Conditions of Sale in addition to their purchase-money.

The quantities are taken from the Ordnance map, on which the accompanying plan is also based.

Clippesby Church

The church of Clippesby St Peter is one of 124 existing round-tower churches in Norfolk.
St. Peter's is adjacent to Clippesby Hall once the residence of the artist Peregrine Feeney. The Hall and presumably the Church were visited regularly by the noted Pre-Raphaelite John William Waterhouse. In another artistic link the church was the subject of a painting by John Sell Cotman.  Another distinction is a fine Arts and Crafts style stained glass window "Suffer little children", the first professional commission by M. E. Aldrich Rope, c1919.

Church history
The church of St. Peter's at Clippesby is thought to date from Saxon times. Curiously however there is no mention of it in the Domesday Book. The round tower is certainly of Saxon construction as is a small (now sealed) window, whereas the North doorway with its characteristic zig-zag moulding is Norman. The tower was augmented with an octagonal bell tower in the early 1900s. A tiny mass dial (2" Across) is located in the porch and dates from c.1400. The church register dates from 1737 and resides at the Norfolk Records Office.

Rectors of St. Peter's

 1320 Thomas de Spyney.
 1326 Peter de Pagefield.
 1338 Ralph de Depham.
 1338 John Urry.
 1338 Ralph de Urry.
 1352 Edmund de Fressingfeld.
 1361 Henry Gottes.
 1389 Henry Waggestaff.
 1390 Thomas de Martham.
 1409 John Dynyngton.
 1432 Bartholomew Fuller.
 1433 Walter Drury (or Davy).
 1440 John Heroun (or Heton).
 1459 John Dalton (alias Bentbowe).
 1471 Thomas Hauley.
 1473 Richard Foo.
 1477 Roger Grenegress.
 1490 Thomas Foulsham.
 1507 John Owdolf.
 1513 John Makins.
 1542 William Smith.
 15... Richard Croder.
 1561 Edward Sharpe. 
 1593 John Nevinson.
 1602 Wiliam Parrye.
 1633 Henry Julian. (Appointed 1633, Subscribed 1662, died 1671).
 1640 ........ Drury.    ) minister?
 16... Thomas Dockwra. ) minister?
 1671 Cuthbert Norris.
 1697 Isaac Laughton.
 1719 George Hill. 
 1721 Charles Trimmel.
 1723 William Adams.
 1742 Robert Goodwyn.
 1789 Christopher Taylor.
 1820 William Colby.
 1860 Henry Joseph Muskett.
 1897 Alfred William Lovely Rivett.
 1918 Owen Manby.
 1931 Bernard Milner Pickering.
 1935 William James Hughes Sinett.
 1946 Harry Woodfield Davies.
 1954 Edward Hamley Turtle.
 1957 William Graham Brooking Snell.
 1980 Robin Howard Elphick.
 1985 Kenneth Newton.
 1990 Christopher Cousins.
 1992 Peter Stanley Paine.
 1997 (Hon. Asst, Curate in tandem with P. Paine) Daphne Marcelle Bradford.
 2005 Jeanette Crafer.
 2007 (In tandem with J. Crafer) Sandra Helen Mitchell)

References

http://kepn.nottingham.ac.uk/map/place/Norfolk/Clippesby

External links
St Peter's on the European Round Tower Churches Website
Clippesby Hall,
Website with a photo of JWWaterhouse at Clippesby Hall

Villages in Norfolk
Former civil parishes in Norfolk
Borough of Great Yarmouth
Norfolk Broads